Keano Deacon (born 4 April 1996) is an English semi-professional footballer who plays as a midfielder. He played professionally for Fleetwood Town.

Career
Deacon made his professional debut for Fleetwood Town in March 2016. He moved to Stalybridge Celtic in February 2017.

After spells with Burgess Hill and Droylsden he re-joined Stalybridge Celtic in August 2020, remaining at the club until October. He rejoined the club again in May 2021, making some additional first team appearances before leaving in September.

Career statistics

References

1996 births
Living people
English footballers
Fleetwood Town F.C. players
Stalybridge Celtic F.C. players
English Football League players
Association football midfielders
Burgess Hill Town F.C. players
Droylsden F.C. players
Northern Premier League players